Low Lake (or Lac Low) is a lake in western Quebec, Canada. It is located in the municipality of Baie-James.

Lakes of Nord-du-Québec